The Valparaíso Region of central Chile was struck by an earthquake of magnitude 7.8  at 22:03 8 July 1971 local time (03:03 9 July UTC). It had a maximum felt intensity of IX (violent) on the Modified Mercalli intensity scale and caused the deaths of 83 people and injured a further 447.

Tectonic setting
Central Chile lies on the destructive plate boundary where the Nazca Plate is being subducted beneath the South American Plate. The rate of convergence at this boundary in central Chile is about 74 mm per year. The boundary has a long history of destructive earthquakes and damaging tsunamis. Events occur on the plate interface and within both the subducting slab and the over-riding plate.

Earthquake
The focal mechanism and hypocentral depth of this earthquake are consistent with rupture along the plate interface. The aftershock locations spread from the epicenter westwards towards the trench.

Damage
The earthquake caused widespread damage across central Chile, with the port city of Valparaíso being the most affected. A total of 83 people were killed, a further 447 were injured and 40,000 made homeless.

See also
List of earthquakes in 1971
List of earthquakes in Chile

References

Earthquakes in Chile
1971 earthquakes
July 1971 events in South America